The Springfield Local School District, commonly called the Springfield Spartans, is a public school district in Summit County, Ohio, United States, that covers Springfield Township and the village of Lakemore. The school district currently serves 2,226 students as of the 2020–21 school year.

Board of Education 
The Superintendent of the district is Shelley Monachino. The board is currently seated by five members. The President of the Board is Larry Petry, with Cynthia Frola as vice-president. The other members on the Board is David Hofer, Kenneth Ray, & Miranda Terry.

2020 - ongoing financial crisis 
As of May 2022, Springfield Local School District has been operating for twenty-two years without new sources of financing. Early on in the COVID-19 Pandemic, the Ohio Department of Education cut nearly half a million dollars of funding to the district, and Springfield introduced a 7.7 million dollar levy that would keep the district financially stable. The levy was defeated by voters in both August and November of that year, and Springfield was forced to begin drastic budget cuts. Provisions of the cuts include closing Young Elementary School, cutting 20.75 positions in the spring of 2021, cutting 46 positions in the 2021–22 school year, drastic or complete cuts to electives, and minimum busing requirements per regulations put in place by the state of Ohio. The district has also endorsed the Fair School Funding Plan in hopes that it will mitigate some of the cuts.

Schools
The school district currently runs three schools, and serves students from kindergarten age to senior year.

List of schools and Principles

Elementary Schools (K-2)
 Spring Hill Elementary School (Jennifer Ganzer)

Intermediate School (3-6)
 Schrop Intermediate School (Lisa Vardon)

High School (7-12)
 Springfield High School (Michelle Warner)

Closed Schools
 Milroy School
 Lakemore Elementary School
 Roosevelt Elementary School
 Sawyerwood School
 Boyer Elementary
 Young Elementary

List of Superintendents 
The following is a list of people who have served as superintendents for Springfield Local School District, beginning with the most recent.

 Shelley Monachino (July 1, 2022 – present)
 William Stauffer (January 1, 2022 – June 30, 2022)
 Charles Sincere (February 1, 2015 – December 31, 2021)

References

External links
 

School districts in Summit County, Ohio